Lamport's Distributed Mutual Exclusion Algorithm is a contention-based algorithm for mutual exclusion on a distributed system.

Algorithm

Nodal properties 

 Every process maintains a queue of pending requests for entering critical section in order. The queues are ordered by virtual time stamps derived from Lamport timestamps.

Algorithm

Requesting process

 Pushing its request in its own queue (ordered by time stamps)
 Sending a request to every node.
 Waiting for replies from all other nodes.
 If own request is at the head of its queue and all replies have been received, enter critical section.
 Upon exiting the critical section, remove its request from the queue and send a release message to every process.

Other processes

 After receiving a request, pushing the request in its own request queue (ordered by time stamps) and reply with a time stamp.
 After receiving release message, remove the corresponding request from its own request queue.

Message complexity

This algorithm creates 3(N − 1) messages per request, or (N − 1) messages and 2 broadcasts. 3(N − 1) messages per request includes: 
 (N − 1) total number of requests
 (N − 1) total number of replies
 (N − 1) total number of releases

Drawbacks 

This algorithm has several disadvantages. They are:

 It is very unreliable as failure of any one of the processes will halt progress.
 It has a high message complexity of 3(N − 1) messages per entry/exit into the critical section.

See also
 Ricart-Agrawala algorithm (an improvement over Lamport's algorithm)
 Lamport's bakery algorithm
 Raymond's algorithm
 Maekawa's algorithm
 Suzuki-Kasami algorithm
 Naimi-Trehel's algorithm

References

Concurrency control algorithms
Distributed computing